Lähkma Nature Reserve is a nature reserve which is located in Pärnu County, Estonia.

The area of the nature reserve is 103 ha.

The protected area was founded in 2007 to protect valuable habitat types and threatened species in Kikepera village (former Surju Parish).

References

Nature reserves in Estonia
Geography of Pärnu County